San Vicente de Cañete District is one of sixteen districts of Cañete Province in Peru.

The capital is San Vicente de Cañete.

References